Dracula Sucks is a 1978 American pornographic horror film directed and co-written by Philip Marshak. The film is based on the 1931 film Dracula, and the 1897 novel of the same name by Bram Stoker. It stars Jamie Gillis as Count Dracula, a vampire who purchases an estate next to a mental institution. The film also stars Annette Haven, John Leslie, Serena, Reggie Nalder, Kay Parker, and John Holmes. An alternate cut of Dracula Sucks, titled Lust at First Bite, has also been released.

Plot

In a psychiatric institution patients are acting oddly and are being found with bite marks in their necks. Professor Van Helsing believes it to be the work of vampires and just when things are bad, it gets worse with the arrival of Count Dracula.

Cast
 Jamie Gillis as Dracula
 Annette Haven as Mina
 John Leslie as Dr. Arthur Seward
 Serena as Lucy Webster
 Reggie Nalder as Dr. Van Helsing (as Detlef van Berg)
 Kay Parker as Dr. Sybil Seward
 John Holmes as Dr. John Stoker
 Mike Ranger as Dr. Peter Bradley
 Paul Thomas as Jonathan Harker
 Richard Bulik as Richard Renfield
 Pat Manning as Irene Renfield
 David Lee Bynum as Jarvis
 Seka as Nurse Betty Lawson

Critical reception
Kristen Sollee of Bustle called the film "a gem from the first wave of horror porn."

Home media
In October 2014, Dracula Sucks was released on DVD by Vinegar Syndrome. In August 2018, Vinegar Syndrome released the film on Blu-ray as part of their 5 Films 5 Years Volume #3 set, a release which also contains four other films.
In 2021, it was released on 4k UHD and Bluray under the Peekarama label .

References

External links
 

1970s exploitation films
1970s pornographic films
1978 horror films
American exploitation films
American pornographic films
American sexploitation films
Pornographic horror films
American vampire films
Dracula films
1970s English-language films
1970s American films